Leandro Suhr Avondet (born 24 September 1997) is a Uruguayan professional footballer who plays as a forward for Uruguayan Primera División club Plaza Colonia.

International career
Suhr is a former Uruguayan youth international.

Career statistics

References

External links

1997 births
Living people
Uruguayan people of German descent
Plaza Colonia players
Uruguayan Primera División players
Uruguayan Segunda División players
Uruguayan footballers
Association football forwards